= Right for Education =

Not-for-profit organization based in Ghana

- Founder: Dr Susann Dattenberg-Doyle, Queen of Gbi Kpoeta
- Website: www.rightforeducation.org

The Right for Education Foundation is a not-for-profit organization based in Ghana. The foundation is registered as a charitable organization in Ireland and Ghana with registration number 20204862 and CG126112014 respectively.^{[1]} The foundation activities are non-partisan and non-religious. The foundation operates independently of governments. The main objective of the foundation is to provide educational materials to a greater audience to Africans through digital platforms.

Right for Education (R:Ed) meets those objectives by operating an online platform such as website, Facebook, and Instagram pages that distribute R:Ed's unique educational content. The contents are from the Oxford University Society and R:Ed chapters. R:Ed is organized from a community, national and international level providing a platform for Africans. R:Ed has a presence in over 45 countries in Africa.^{[2]} Over 95% of the followers are from Africa^{[3]}. R:Ed followers are aged 18 to 35 of whom 33% are female and 67% are male. The followers consist of 30% Francophone and 70% Anglophone of which 70% claim of having higher education.^{[3]} The website of Right for Education has an average of 33,681 user per month.^{[4]} R:Ed presence is also felt in its sister television and radio stations based in Africa.

R:Ed has versatile chapters including Oxford University Society, Ghana, Uganda, Nigeria, South Africa, Kenya, Soroti University, Cameroon, Togo, Senegal, Burkina Faso and growing.

Right for Education Africa claims to have been ranked the number one largest Facebook page in Africa, in 2022.^{[3]} R:Ed content are 100% original and covers a range of subjects. The R:Ed relies on contributions form organizations and private donors for funding.

REdy was established in 2008. REdy-Africa is the commercial partner of R:Ed.

== History ==
Dr Susann Dattenberg-Doyle, Queen of Gbi Kpoeta in 2006

Right for Education was established in 1999 by Dr Susann Dattenberg-Doyle. She is a psychologist and Associate Fellow of the British Psychological Society. Dattenberg-Doyle first became involved in education in Ghana in 1999 and funded the creation of a school in 2004 in Kpoeta in the Upper Volta region ^{[6]}. In 2006, Susi was made Queen of Gbi Kpoeta ^{[6]}. Despite initiatives to create further schools in the region, she was much concern on issues of accessibility to educational resources. As a result, R:Ed changed to focus on providing educational materials to a greater audience by placing them online. In 2012, R:Ed was granted NGO status by the Ghanaian government. Right for Education was officially founded in 2016 ^{[6]}. The foundation's website currently holds all its published educational materials. In 2019, the foundation was approached to collaborate with the Ghanaian Ministry of Education ^{[8]} and was also invited as a speak at the Commonwealth Africa Summit 2019.

== Organisation ==
Right for Education has registered charitable status in Ireland and NGO status in Ghana.

Its partners include Facebook and Oxford University (Career Development Department) and Dortmound University.

== Methodology ==
R:Ed has a number of chapters and societies in African countries and universities respectively. The groups develop content for R:Ed. The members continuously undergo training to meet the evolving needs of R:Ed followers. The team exploit volunteers to writer articles and at times develop reading materials tailored to the needs of a community. R:Ed has a structure and detailed procedure from the generation of topic idea till publication. It is documented in R:Ed workflow and master schedule to easily integrate new volunteers. The articles are written on a wide range to subject ranging from human rights, home and family, law and governance, health and medicine, business, African culture, science and technology, and environment. Currents trending topics are usually published to meet the information demands of R:Ed followers. Contents created are published in both English and French language. They are designed to have low data costs due to the scarcity of strong and inexpensive internet connections across Africa.

== Structure ==
The organization is governed by the board of directors from both Ireland and Ghana. The Chief Executive Officer (CEO) is charged with the management of the business in line with the directives from the board. The management team sees to the day to day activities of the organization and monitors the works of the country’s chapters and societies across Africa. The chapters and the societies have their executives managed by the Chapter and Society Development Officers (both for Anglophone and Francophone).
